George Foss may refer to:

 George Edmund Foss (1863–1936), U.S. Representative from Illinois
 George Foote Foss (1876–1968), machinist, blacksmith, bicycle repairman and inventor from Quebec
 George Foss (baseball) (1897–1969), Major League Baseball player